Grise Fiord Airport  is located in Grise Fiord, Nunavut, Canada, and is operated by the Government of Nunavut. The only building at this airport is the Air Passenger Shelter and the companies that operate there are Air Nunavut using the Super King Air 200 and Kenn Borek Air using the DHC-6 Twin Otter planes. Flights to this airport are usually from Resolute Bay Airport and most of them only carry cargo with few to no passengers.

Airlines and destinations

References

External links

Registered aerodromes in the Qikiqtaaluk Region